Barry Joseph Evans (18 June 1943 – 9 February 1997) was an English actor best known for his appearances in British sitcoms such as Doctor in the House and Mind Your Language.

Biography

Early life
Born in Guildford, Surrey, and orphaned as a baby, Evans was educated at the orphanage boarding schools run by the Shaftesbury Homes, first at Fortescue House School in Twickenham in a Dr Barnardo's Home, and then at Bisley Boys' School in Bisley, Surrey. His acting ability was recognised at an early age and he often played the leading roles in school plays. He briefly lived in Yalding before moving to London. Evans attended the Italia Conti Academy and later won a John Gielgud Scholarship to study at the Central School of Speech and Drama.

Career
One of his first film credits was the lead role in Clive Donner's film Here We Go Round the Mulberry Bush (1968) where he was cast as Jamie McGregor, a teenager who finds it difficult to lose his virginity. Photoplay magazine called Evans a "bright and exciting new actor", and The Sunday Telegraph described his screen debut as "brilliant".

Here We Go Round the Mulberry Bush represented a breakthrough in a number of technical features: the script, the photography and the filming techniques. Jamie McGregor speaks his thoughts out loud. The soundtrack mainly  contained songs performed by The Spencer Davis Group and Traffic. The film was listed to compete at the 1968 Cannes Film Festival, but the Festival was cancelled that year. The film saw the beginning of a long-lasting friendship between Barry Evans and the director, Clive Donner, whom Evans regarded as one of his best friends. He worked with Donner again in 1969 in the historical epic Alfred the Great.

In 1969, Evans appeared alongside Roddy McDowall in an episode of the series Journey to the Unknown entitled "The Killing Bottle", as a man planning to murder his brother for the inheritance.

His first significant television role was in the sitcom Doctor in the House (1969–1970), based on Richard Gordon's series of novels, which had already been turned into a feature film series. Evans starred as the young student doctor Michael Upton, to whom Evans felt he bore no similarities. Following the show's success he starred in the sequel to the series, Doctor at Large (1971). Evans enjoyed working with his fellow actors George Layton, Geoffrey Davies, Robin Nedwell and Richard O'Sullivan, and he later described these as the best years of his life. Work on the "Doctor" series was extremely intense and left him no time to take on other roles; he therefore declined to appear in the later sequels. However, in a 1977 interview he stated that he had been "incredibly stupid" to turn the series down.

In 1971, Evans played the character of Eli Frome in Pete Walker's low-budget thriller Die Screaming, Marianne, alongside Susan George. In 1976, he had the lead role in Stanley Long's sex comedy Adventures of a Taxi Driver. Unlike in Here We Go Round the Mulberry Bush, in which the viewer partakes in Jamie's thoughts, Evans's character breaks the fourth wall throughout the film. Although the film was successful, Evans decided not to appear in the sequels, but he starred in the similarly themed Under the Doctor the same year.

Evans also did some theatre work, but this did not prove financially worthwhile, and he spent several spells claiming benefits. He wrote to London Weekend Television, "and told them ... I was still alive". This led to what became his best-known comedy role, as Jeremy Brown in the ITV sitcom Mind Your Language (1977–1979, 1986), which was a humorous look at an evening class tutor teaching English to foreign students. The series was written by TV scriptwriter Vince Powell, and was adapted for American TV as What a Country! in 1986.  In the same year it was briefly revived in Britain for a further 13 episodes.

Later career 
In 1982–1983, Evans played Dick Emery's trusted assistant Robin Bright in the comedy thriller series Legacy of Murder.

By the latter half of the 1980s, Evans's youthful appearance was working against him and he found it difficult to obtain mature acting roles in keeping with his age. His last role was as Bazzard in the 1993 film adaptation of The Mystery of Edwin Drood. By the mid–1990s, Evans was working as a minicab driver in Leicestershire.

Death
In February 1997, police discovered Evans' body in his living room after going to the house to tell him that they had recovered his stolen car, which had been reported missing the day before. The cause of his death has never been confirmed. The coroner found a blow to Evans's head and also found high levels of alcohol in his system. A short will was found on a table next to his body and a spilt packet of aspirin tablets was found on the floor, bearing a pre-decimalisation price tag (i.e., before 1971), indicating that the pack was at least 26 years old; although the coroner concluded that he had not taken any of them. An open verdict was eventually given. An 18-year-old man was arrested but later released without charge due to insufficient evidence.
Evans was cremated at Golders Green Crematorium.

Legacy 
A blue plaque commemorating Evans, erected by The Heritage Foundation, is situated at 8 Buckland Crescent in Belsize Park, north west London. He lived at this address from 1960 until the early 1980s. A memorial charity lunch in aid of Barnardo's was held in honour of Evans and Mind Your Language writer Vince Powell at the Marriot Hotel near Marble Arch in central London.

TV credits

Filmography

See also
List of unsolved deaths

References

External links
 

 
 
 

1943 births
1997 deaths
20th-century English male actors
Actors from Guildford
Alumni of the Italia Conti Academy of Theatre Arts
Alumni of the Royal Central School of Speech and Drama
English male television actors
Golders Green Crematorium
Male actors from Surrey
Unsolved deaths in England